Eenam Gambhir is posted as Counsellor in the Permanent Mission of India to the United Nations in New York.  She is a 2005-batch IFS officer and is presently posted at the Permanent Mission of India to the UN at New York.

In UN, Eenam Gambhir is representing India for the  "Security  Council Reform, Counter-terrorism, Cyber security issues, Security Council (regional issues), All Special Missions including those approved by UNSC, NAM coordination and Outreach w Universities/Colleges - Coordination" related topics.

She rose to prominence in Indian media outlets after she condemned the actions of Pakistan in United Nation's assembly.  Gambhir attacked Pakistan on the topic of sponsorship of terrorism. She stated that "the land of Taxila, the greatest site of learning in ancient India, is now host to the Ivy league of terrorists around the globe".

References 

Living people
Indian Foreign Service officers
Indian diplomats
Hindu College, Delhi alumni
1983 births